The tallest structure in the City of Paris and the Île-de-France remains the Eiffel Tower in the 7th arrondissement, 300 meters high (or 330 m including the broadcasting antenna at its top), completed in 1889 as the gateway to the 1889 Paris Universal Exposition. The tallest building in the Paris region is the Tour First, at 231 meters, located in La Defense. It is tied for ninth place among the tallest buildings in the European Union. The tallest building within the city limits of Paris is the Tour Montparnasse, 210 meters high.

Tallest buildings and structures
The Paris region has three of the tallest twenty-five building in the European Union; the Tour First, the Tour Hekla, and the Tour Montparnasse. As of 2022, there are 23 skyscrapers that reach a roof height of at least .

Most of the Paris region's high-rise buildings are located in three distinct areas:

 La Défense, located just west of the City of Paris in the département of the Hauts-de-Seine. Eight of the tallest ten buildings and structures in the region are located in La Defense.
 Italie 13, located in the southern half of the 13th arrondissement: The 13th arrondissement towers are mostly residential, located in the south of the arrondissement, in what is today le Quartier chinois (Chinatown);
 Front de Seine, located in the 15th arrondissement: Most of the buildings of the Front de Seine, which is in close proximity to the Eiffel Tower, were built in the 1970s and 1980s and are of mixed commercial and residential use. The tallest building is the Tour Montparnasse.

Other high-rise buildings are scattered throughout the Paris area, mainly in close proximity to the Périphérique freeway. These include Les Mercuriales in Bagnolet, the Tour Pleyel in Saint-Denis, and the Hôtel Hyatt Regency Paris Étoile in the city proper (near the Porte Maillot).

However the tallest tower is built within central Paris: the iconic Eiffel Tower standing alongside the Seine River at the heart of the 7th arrondissement. Built in 1889, it was the first man-made structure in the world to exceed 1,000 feet.

This list ranks the Paris area buildings and structures that stand at least 100 meters tall. Existing structures are included for ranking purposes based on present height.

Structures proposed, approved, or under construction
This is a list of structures that are either under construction or due to start construction soon. Structures are sorted by planned height.
The Authority managing La Défense, the EPAD, has launched several contests for new towers in a large scale operation of renovation of the business district. Other proposed projects are currently being talked about in other municipalities of the inner suburbs such as Issy-les-Moulineaux, Boulogne-Billancourt or Saint-Denis.

See also 
 List of tallest buildings in France

References 

 Schaugg, Johannes: High-Rise Buildings: Paris, Books on Demand, 2009, .

External links 
 Paris area diagrams on Skyscraperpage.com: Diagrams showing the tallest structures in the Paris urban area
 Emporis page on the Paris metro area: International database of highrise buildings (incomplete)
 Structurae: International database of structures (incomplete)

Paris
Buildings, tallest